Essays: Second Series is a series of essays written by Ralph Waldo Emerson in 1844, concerning transcendentalism.  It is the second volume of Emerson's Essays, the first being Essays: First Series. This book contains:

"The Poet"
"Experience"
"Character"
"Manners"
"Gifts"
"Nature"
"Politics"
"Nominalist and Realist"
"New England Reformers"

See also

Essays: First Series
Nature
New England Reformers

External links 
 

Essay collections by Ralph Waldo Emerson
1844 books
1844 essays